The Davao del Norte Football Association is a provincial football association under the Philippine Football Federation (PFF) which serves Davao del Norte area. As of 2015, it is led by president Renato Cosmod who is also simultaneously serving as Vice President of the PFF. The Davao del Norte F.A. sends a team to represent the region in the yearly PFF National Men's Club Championship.

References

Football governing bodies in the Philippines
Sports in Davao del Norte